Reynaldo Marquez was the fourth commissioner of the Philippine Basketball Association. He also served as a member of the league's board of governors, representing Formula Shell before being appointed as commissioner.

PBA Commissioner
Despite only lasting two seasons, Marquez made significant changes that continues to affect the league until today. Marquez changed the schedule of the All-Filipino Conference to the beginning of the season in what is now the Philippine Cup. Marquez also started the Commissioner's Cup and the Governor's Cup.

External links
PBA Official Website

Living people
Philippine Basketball Association executives
1932 births